Lokam may refer to:

 Kotha Bangaru Lokam, a 2008 Telugu film
 Maya Lokam, a 1945 Telugu film
 Tava lokam, one of the Seven Logas (Seven Upper Worlds) in Ayyavazhi mythology